Jake Cooper-Woolley (born 18 November 1989) is an English professional rugby union player. He currently plays at Prop for Sale Sharks.

Early life 

Cooper-Woolley was born in Reigate and attended St Bede's School in Redhill, Surrey. While at school, he played for Dorking and was a part of the Harlequins Elite Player Development Group (EPDG) before deciding to focus on his studies at Cardiff University, Cooper-Woolley also competed in the England Schools Championship at shot-putt.

Club career 

While studying at Cardiff University, Cooper-Woolley signed for the Cardiff Blues regional side, and played club rugby for Bedwas for two seasons (2010–11 and 2011–12), scoring one try in 25 appearances. He also played five times for Cardiff RFC in 2013, scoring two tries.

Cooper-Woolley was a try-scorer when leading Cardiff University in the 2012 Welsh Varsity Match.

Cooper-Woolley signed for Wasps for the 2013-14 season. In May 2016 it was announced that his contract with Wasps had been extended.

After six seasons with Wasps, Cooper-Woolley signs for Premiership rivals Sale Sharks from the 2019-20 season.

International career 

Member of England Saxons, debut in win against Ireland in 2015 (RFU profile)

References

External links 
 

1989 births
Living people
Bedwas RFC players
Cardiff RFC players
English rugby union players
Rugby union players from Redhill, Surrey
Sale Sharks players
Wasps RFC players
Rugby union props